Kushmanakovo (Quşmanak) is a rural locality (a village) and the administrative centre of Kushmanakovsky Selsoviet, Burayevsky District, Bashkortostan, Russia. The population was 367 as of 2010. There are 8 streets.

Geography 
Kushmanakovo is located 12 km southwest of Burayevo (the district's administrative centre) by road. Karatamak is the nearest rural locality.

References 

Rural localities in Burayevsky District